Firgrove is a townland in the Barony of Ormond Lower, County Tipperary, Ireland. Firgrove is located approximately 6 km west of Borrisokane.

References

Townlands of County Tipperary